Wambon is a Papuan language of Papua, Indonesia.

References

Lebold, Randy, Ron Kriens, Myo-Sook Sohn and Yunita Susanto. 2014. Report on the Upper Digul Helicopter Survey. SIL International.

External links
Digul Wambon at the Awyu–Ndumut research group at VU University Amsterdam:
Yonggom Wambon at the Awyu–Ndumut research group at VU University Amsterdam:

Languages of western New Guinea
Awyu–Dumut languages